Christoph Edelmüller (born 15 October 1981) is an Austrian handball player for Fivers Margareten and the Austrian national team.

References

1981 births
Living people
Austrian male handball players
Handball players from Vienna